
This is a list of aircraft in alphabetical order beginning with 'Ti'.

Ti

Tianxing-l 
 Tianxing-l 1

Tiffany 
(Sarter Tiffany)
 Tiffany Sport

Tiger 
(Tiger Aircraft LLC, Martinsburg, WV)
 Tiger Aircraft AG-5B Tiger

Tiger Club Development 
 Tiger Club Development Sherwood Ranger

Tijuana
(Tijuana Aircraft Co. / Waterhouse / BAJA California / Compañía Aérea de Construcción y Transportes)
 Tijuana BAJA California BC.1
 Tijuana BAJA California BC.2
 Tijuana BAJA California BC.3

Tikhonravov 
 Tikhonravov 302
 Tikhonravov 302P

Tilbury 
(Owen R Tilbury, Normal, IL, Tilbury & (Clarence) Fundy, Bloomington, IL or IN)
 Tilbury S-10 Skywayman
 Tilbury SF-1 Flash

Time to Fly
(Kaunas, Lithuania)
Time To Fly Backplane SL
Time To Fly Racket
Time To Fly Scooter

Time Warp Aircraft
(Lakeland, FL)
Time Warp Spitfire Mk V

Timm 
(O W (Otto William) Timm Aircraft Corp, 901 N San Fernando Rd, Glendale, CA)
 Timm 160
 Timm Aerocraft 2AS
 Timm Argonaut
 Timm AG-2
 Timm C-165 Collegiate
 Timm C-170 Collegiate
 Timm C-185 Collegiate
 Timm K-90 Collegiate
 Timm K-100 Collegiate
 Timm M-150 Collegiate
 Timm TC-165 Collegiate
 Timm TW-120 Collegiate
 Timm Coach
 Timm Curtiss Pusher replica
 Timm Monoplane
 Timm P Sedan
 Timm PT-160K
 Timm PT-175K
 Timm PT-220
 Timm S-160
 Timm Skylark
 Timm T-800
 Timm T-840 Aeromold Transport
 Timm N2T Tutor

Timofeyev 
(Viktor Timofeyev)
 Timofeyev Mustang 2

Tipsy 
(Avions Tipsy)
See also List of aircraft (0-A)#Avions Fairey
 Tipsy B side by side trainer
 Tipsy Bc side by side cabin version of B
 Tipsy Belfair
 Tipsy Junior
 Tipsy M
 Tipsy Nipper
 Tipsy S
 Tipsy S.2

Tipton 
(George W "Billy" Tipton, Old Richards Airport, Kansas City, MO)
 Tipton 90-2
 Tipton W-7200X

Tisserand 
(Designer: Claude Tisserand)
 Tisserand Hydroplum
 Tisserand Hydroplum Ia
 Tisserand Hydroplum II
 Tisserand Pétrel

Tissot-Charbonnier 
 Tissot-Charbonnier TC-160 Oceanair

Titan 
(Titan Aircraft, Austinburg Ohio)
 Titan Tornado
 Titan Tornado 103
 Titan Tornado Sport
 Titan Tornado MG
 Titan Tornado I
 Titan Tornado I Sport
 Titan Tornado II
 Titan Tornado II Trainer
 Titan Tornado II Sport
 Titan Tornado II 912
 Titan Tornado II FP
 Titan Tornado MG II
 Titan Tornado S
 Titan Tornado SS
 Titan T-51 Mustang

Titanium
(Titanium Auto Gyro)
 Titanium Explorer

References

Further reading

External links 

 List of aircraft (T)